The Eddie Robinson Coach of the Year Award is given annually to a college football coach by the Football Writers Association of America. The award honors Eddie Robinson, former coach at Grambling State University.

Winners

References

College football coach of the year awards in the United States
Awards established in 1957